Ostaszewski is a Polish masculine surname, its feminine counterpart is Ostaszewska. It may refer to
Ostoja-Ostaszewski, Polish noble family
Mateusz Ostaszewski (born 1998), Polish football midfielder 
Maja Ostaszewska (born 1972), Polish actress
Piotr Ostaszewski (born 1964), Polish historian, political scientist, translator

Polish-language surnames